Hellinsia is a genus of moths in the family Pterophoridae. It was created by J.W. Tutt in honour of the entomologist John Hellins.

Species
The genus contains the following species:

Hellinsia acuminatus (Meyrick, 1920)
Hellinsia adumbratus (Walsingham, 1881)
Hellinsia aegyptiacus (Rebel, 1914)
Hellinsia aethiopicus (Amsel, 1963)
Hellinsia agraphodactylus (Walker, 1864)
Hellinsia aguilerai Gielis, 2011
Hellinsia aistleitneri Arenberger, 2006
Hellinsia albidactylus (Yano, 1963)
Hellinsia albilobata (McDunnough, 1939)
Hellinsia aldabrensis (T.B. Fletcher, 1910)
Hellinsia alfaroi Gielis, 2011
Hellinsia ammonias (Meyrick, 1909)
Hellinsia angela Gielis, 2011
Hellinsia angulofuscus (Gielis, 1991)
Hellinsia ares (Barnes & Lindsey, 1921)
Hellinsia argutus 
Hellinsia arion (Barnes & Lindsey, 1921)
Hellinsia aruna Arenberger, 1991
Hellinsia auster (Barnes & Lindsey, 1921)
Hellinsia balanotes (Meyrick, 1908) (sometimes placed in Oidaematophorus)
Hellinsia barbatus 
Hellinsia basalis (Möschler, 1890)
Hellinsia basuto Kovtunovich & Ustjuzhanin, 2011
Hellinsia batallonica 
Hellinsia bawana Arenberger, 2010
Hellinsia benalcazari Gielis, 2011
Hellinsia beneficus (Yano & Heppner, 1983)
Hellinsia bengtssoni Gielis, 2009
Hellinsia betsiae (Gielis, 1991)
Hellinsia bhutanensis 
Hellinsia biangulata Gielis & de Vos, 2006
Hellinsia bigoti (Rougeot, 1983)
Hellinsia bogotanus (Felder & Rogenhofer, 1875)
Hellinsia brandbergi Arenberger, 2004
Hellinsia cadmus (Barnes & Lindsey, 1921)
Hellinsia cajanuma Gielis, 2011
Hellinsia calais (Meyrick, 1930)
Hellinsia callidus (Meyrick, 1913)
Hellinsia canari Gielis, 2011
Hellinsia caras Gielis, 2011
Hellinsia carphodactoides Gielis, 2003
Hellinsia carphodactyla (Hübner, 1813)
Hellinsia caudelli (Dyar, 1903)
Hellinsia cervicalis (Meyrick, 1932)
Hellinsia chamelai (Gielis, 1992)
Hellinsia chlorias (Meyrick, 1908)
Hellinsia chrysocomae (Ragonot, 1875)
Hellinsia chuncheonensis Kim, 2009
Hellinsia cinerarius (Philippi, 1864)
Hellinsia citrites (Meyrick, 1908)
Hellinsia cochise (Barnes & Lindsey, 1921)
Hellinsia colubratus (Meyrick, 1909)
Hellinsia confusus (Braun, 1930)
Hellinsia conjunctus (Zeller, 1877)
Hellinsia conscius (Meyrick, 1920)
Hellinsia contortus (McDunnough, 1938)
Hellinsia conyzae (Gibeaux, 1994)
Hellinsia coquimboicus (Gielis, 1991)
Hellinsia corvus (Barnes & Lindsey, 1921)
Hellinsia costalba 
Hellinsia costatus (Barnes & Lindsey, 1921)
Hellinsia crescens (Meyrick, 1926)
Hellinsia cristobalis (B. Landry & Gielis, 1992)
Hellinsia cuculla Gielis, 2011
Hellinsia cyrtoacanthaus Kim, 2009
Hellinsia delospilus (Meyrick, 1921)
Hellinsia devriesi (B. Landry & Gielis, 1992)
Hellinsia didactylites (Ström, 1783)
Hellinsia discors (Meyrick, 1913)
Hellinsia distinctus (Herrich-Schäffer, 1855)
Hellinsia elhacha 
Hellinsia elliottii (Fernald, 1893)
Hellinsia emmelinoida Gielis, 2008
Hellinsia emmorus (Walsingham, 1915)
Hellinsia epileucus (Walsingham, 1915)
Hellinsia eros (Barnes & Lindsey, 1921)
Hellinsia excors (Meyrick, 1930)
Hellinsia falsus (Barnes & Lindsey, 1921)
Hellinsia fieldi (Wright, 1921)
Hellinsia fishii (Fernald, 1893)
Hellinsia fissuralba 
Hellinsia fissuripuncta 
Hellinsia fletcheri 
Hellinsia fumiventris (Zeller, 1877)
Hellinsia furfurosus (Meyrick, 1911)
Hellinsia fusciciliatus (Zeller, 1877)
Hellinsia fuscomarginata 
Hellinsia fuscotransversa 
Hellinsia glaphyrotes (Meyrick, 1908)
Hellinsia glenni (Cashatt, 1972)
Hellinsia glochinias (Meyrick, 1908)
Hellinsia grandaevus (Meyrick, 1931)
Hellinsia grandis (Fish, 1881)
Hellinsia gratiosus (Fish, 1881)
Hellinsia gypsotes (Meyrick, 1937)
Hellinsia habecki Matthews, 2010
Hellinsia haplistes (Meyrick, 1936)
Hellinsia harpactes (Meyrick, 1908)
Hellinsia hebrus (Meyrick, 1932)
Hellinsia helianthi (Walsingham, 1880)
Hellinsia hoguei 
Hellinsia hololeucos (Zeller, 1874)
Hellinsia homodactylus (Walker, 1864)
Hellinsia huayna Gielis, 2011
Hellinsia ignifugax (Walsingham, 1915)
Hellinsia illutus (Meyrick, 1917)
Hellinsia improbus 
Hellinsia inconditus 
Hellinsia innocens 
Hellinsia inquinatus 
Hellinsia integratus 
Hellinsia inulae 
Hellinsia inulaevorus (Gibeaux, 1989)
Hellinsia investis 
Hellinsia invidiosus 
Hellinsia iobates (Barnes & Lindsey, 1921)
Hellinsia iraneaus (Diakonoff, 1952)
Hellinsia ishiyamanus 
Hellinsia kaiapensis Gielis, 2003
Hellinsia katangae Gielis, 2009
Hellinsia kellicottii (Fish, 1881)
Hellinsia kuwayamai 
Hellinsia laciniata 
Hellinsia lacteodactylus 
Hellinsia lacteolus 
Hellinsia lenis 
Hellinsia lienigianus 
Hellinsia linus (Barnes & Lindsey, 1921)
Hellinsia logistes 
Hellinsia longifrons 
Hellinsia lumbaquia Gielis, 2011
Hellinsia luteolus  (Barnes & Lindsey, 1921)
Hellinsia madecasseus (Bigot, 1964)
Hellinsia magnus Gielis, 2011
Hellinsia maldonadoica Gielis, 2011
Hellinsia malesanus 
Hellinsia mallecoicus 
Hellinsia mauleicus 
Hellinsia medius (Barnes & Lindsey, 1921)
Hellinsia mesoleucus (Diakonoff, 1952)
Hellinsia milleri Gielis, 2011
Hellinsia mizar (Barnes & Lindsey, 1921)
Hellinsia mollis 
Hellinsia mongolicus 
Hellinsia monserrate 
Hellinsia monteverda 
Hellinsia montezerpae 
Hellinsia montufari Gielis, 2011
Hellinsia morenoi Gielis, 2011
Hellinsia nauarches 
Hellinsia nephogenes 
Hellinsia nigricalcarius 
Hellinsia nigridactylus 
Hellinsia nigrosparsus 
Hellinsia nivalis 
Hellinsia nodipes 
Hellinsia nuwara 
Hellinsia obandoi 
Hellinsia obscuricilia 
Hellinsia ochracealis 
Hellinsia ochricostatus 
Hellinsia orellanai Gielis, 2011
Hellinsia ossipellis 
Hellinsia osteodactyla (Zeller, 1841) Type species
Hellinsia oxyntes 
Hellinsia paccha Gielis, 2011
Hellinsia paleaceus 
Hellinsia pallens Gielis, 2011
Hellinsia palmatus 
Hellinsia pan (Barnes & Lindsey, 1921)
Hellinsia papallacta Gielis, 2011
Hellinsia paraglochinias 
Hellinsia paramoi 
Hellinsia paraochracealis 
Hellinsia pectodactyla 
Hellinsia pelospilus 
Hellinsia perditus (Barnes & Lindsey, 1921)
Hellinsia phlegmaticus 
Hellinsia phloeochroa 
Hellinsia phoebus (Barnes & Lindsey, 1921)
Hellinsia pichincha Gielis, 2011
Hellinsia pizarroi Gielis, 2011
Hellinsia pollux (Barnes & Lindsey, 1921)
Hellinsia postnigrata Gielis, 2011
Hellinsia powelli 
Hellinsia praealtus 
Hellinsia praenigratus 
Hellinsia probatus 
Hellinsia procontias 
Hellinsia pseudobarbata 
Hellinsia pseudokorbi 
Hellinsia punctata Gielis, 2009
Hellinsia puruha Gielis, 2011
Hellinsia quitus Gielis, 2011
Hellinsia rigidus 
Hellinsia ruminahuii Gielis, 2011
Hellinsia scholasticus 
Hellinsia scribarius 
Hellinsia scripta 
Hellinsia sematias 
Hellinsia shillongi Kovtunovich, 2003
Hellinsia shyri Gielis, 2011
Hellinsia sichuana 
Hellinsia simplicissimus 
Hellinsia siniaevi Kovtunovich, 2003
Hellinsia siskaellus 
Hellinsia socorroica 
Hellinsia solanoi 
Hellinsia sordidatus 
Hellinsia speideli Gielis, 2003
Hellinsia spermatias 
Hellinsia sphenites 
Hellinsia spiculibursa 
Hellinsia stadias 
Hellinsia sublatus 
Hellinsia subnotatus 
Hellinsia subochraceus 
Hellinsia sucrei Gielis, 2011
Hellinsia sulphureodactylus 
Hellinsia surinamensis 
Hellinsia tariensis Gielis, 2003
Hellinsia tephradactyla (Hübner, 1813)
Hellinsia tepidus 
Hellinsia tetraonipennis 
Hellinsia thor 
Hellinsia thoracica 
Hellinsia tinctus 
Hellinsia triadias 
Hellinsia tripunctatus  (=Hellinsia serpens)
Hellinsia triton (Barnes & Lindsey, 1921)
Hellinsia tupaci Gielis, 2011
Hellinsia umrani Kovtunovich, 2003
Hellinsia unicolor 
Hellinsia urbanus 
Hellinsia varioides 
Hellinsia varius (Barnes & Lindsey, 1921)
Hellinsia venapunctus (Barnes & Lindsey, 1921)
Hellinsia wamenae Gielis, 2003
Hellinsia wrangeliensis 
Hellinsia zetes

Former species
Hellinsia ecstaticus (Meyrick, 1932)
Hellinsia pacifica 
Hellinsia purus

References

 
Oidaematophorini
Moth genera
Taxa named by J. W. Tutt